The orange-crowned euphonia (Euphonia saturata) is a species of bird in the family Fringillidae.

Distribution and habitat
It is found in Colombia, Ecuador, and Peru.  Its natural habitats are subtropical or tropical dry forest, subtropical or tropical moist lowland forest, and heavily degraded former forest.

References

orange-crowned euphonia
Birds of Ecuador
Birds of the Tumbes-Chocó-Magdalena
orange-crowned euphonia
Taxonomy articles created by Polbot